Pygmy owls are members of the genus Glaucidium. They belong to the typical owl family, Strigidae.
The genus consists of 29 species distributed worldwide. These are mostly small owls, and some of the species are called "owlets". Most pygmy owl species are nocturnal and they mainly hunt large insects and other small prey.

Taxonomy
The genus Glaucidium was introduced in 1826 by the German zoologist Friedrich Boie. The type species was designated as the Eurasian pygmy owl by George Robert Gray in 1840. The genus name is from Ancient Greek glaukidion meaning "little owl" or "owlet". It is diminutive of glaux meaning "owl".

A molecular phylogenetic study of the owls published in 2019 found that the widely distributed northern hawk-owl (Surnia ulula) is sister to the genus Glaucidium.

Species
The genus contains 29 living species:
 Eurasian pygmy owl (Glaucidium passerinum)
 Pearl-spotted owlet (Glaucidium perlatum)
 Red-chested owlet (Glaucidium tephronotum)
 Sjöstedt's barred owlet (Glaucidium sjostedti)
 Asian barred owlet (Glaucidium cuculoides)
 Javan owlet (Glaucidium castanopterum)
 Jungle owlet (Glaucidium radiatum)
 Chestnut-backed owlet (Glaucidium castanotum)
 African barred owlet (Glaucidium capense)
 Albertine owlet (Glaucidium albertinum)
 Northern pygmy owl (Glaucidium californicum)
 Mountain pygmy owl (Glaucidium gnoma)
 Baja pygmy owl (Glaucidium hoskinsii)
 Guatemalan pygmy owl (Glaucidium cobanense)
 Costa Rican pygmy owl (Glaucidium costaricanum)
 Cloud-forest pygmy owl (Glaucidium nubicola)
 Andean pygmy owl (Glaucidium jardinii)
 Yungas pygmy owl,  (Glaucidium bolivianum)
 Colima pygmy owl,  (Glaucidium palmarum)
 Tamaulipas pygmy owl (Glaucidium sanchezi)
 Central American pygmy owl (Glaucidium griseiceps)
 Subtropical pygmy owl (Glaucidium parkeri)
 Amazonian pygmy owl (Glaucidium hardyi)
 East Brazilian pygmy owl (Glaucidium minutissimum)
 Pernambuco pygmy owl (Glaucidium mooreorum)
 Ferruginous pygmy owl (Glaucidium brasilianum)
 Pacific pygmy owl (Glaucidium peruanum)
 Austral pygmy owl (Glaucidium nana)
 Cuban pygmy owl (Glaucidium siju)

Fossil specimens
Kurochkin's pygmy owl (Glaucidium kurochkini) is a fossil species known from the La Brea Tar Pits that likely went extinct during the Quaternary extinction. The supposed prehistoric species "Glaucidium" dickinsoni is now recognized as a burrowing owl, probably a paleosubspecies providentiae. Bones of an indeterminate Glaucidium have been recovered from Late Pliocene deposits in Poland. Fossil material belonging to a new species of Glaucidium was described in 2020 as G. ireneae. The fossils were recovered from Pliocene/Pleistocene transitional strata in South Africa.

References

External links 

 Pygmy owl information
 Mountain Pygmy Owl
 Mountain Pygmy Owl "eyes in back of head"
 Ferruginous pygmy owl
 Colima pygmy owl
 Eurasian pygmy owl
 "Big fight over tiny owl" - CNN/AP article on pygmy owl's endangered species status in Arizona
 ' Pygmy Owls''  - documentary produced by Oregon Field Guide
 The Neblina Pygmy owl - 2018 BBC internet article on new species found in the Pico da Neblina National Park, Brazil 

Taxa named by Friedrich Boie